The Ee 922 is a class of 21 electric shunting locomotives built since 2009 by Stadler Rail for Swiss Federal Railways.

Ordered in 2007, the units were  delivered from 2009 to 2010. The locomotives are used for shunting passenger stock at terminus stations across Switzerland.

See also
 List of stock used by Swiss Federal Railways

References

15 kV AC locomotives
Bo locomotives
Electric locomotives of Switzerland
Stadler Rail rolling stock
Ee 922
Standard gauge locomotives of Switzerland
Railway locomotives introduced in 2009